Villarreal Club de Fútbol Femenino is the women's football team of Villarreal CF. It currently plays in Liga F.

Season by season

Players

Current squad

Notable former players
  Spain: Sara Monforte
  Spain U–19: Sheila, Aixa Salvador
  Spain U–17: Salma, Nerea Vicente
  England: Hannah Hampton

References

External links
Official site

Women's football clubs in Spain
Villarreal CF
Association football clubs established in 2000
2000 establishments in Spain
Segunda Federación (women) clubs
Primera División (women) clubs